The Institutes (from , 'to establish') is a beginners' textbook on Roman private law written around 161 CE by the classical Roman jurist Gaius. The Institutes are considered to be "by far the most influential elementary-systematic presentation of Roman private law in late antiquity, the Middle Ages and modern times". The content of the textbook was considered to be lost until 1816, when a manuscript of it − probably of the 5th century − was discovered.

The Institutes are divided into four books. The first book considers the legal status of persons, the second and third deal with property rights ( and ), and the fourth  discusses procedural actions.

Discovery and textual history

An almost complete version of the Institutes was discovered by Barthold Georg Niebuhr in 1816 in the form of a palimpsest in Verona (Austrian Empire [Italy]). Niebuhr had just accepted a post as Prussian ambassador to the Papal States, when he was dispatched to negotiate a Concordat with the Catholic Church. On his way to Rome, he systematically searched for palimpsests in various libraries, and discovered the respective manuscript in the Chapter Library of Verona. Under the visible text of the manuscript, which contained letters of Jerome, Niebuhr found an erased copy of the textbook, copied around 500 AD. The content of the Institutes had until then only been indirectly documented, for example in the Digestes.

In a letter to Savigny, Niebuhr at first identified the manuscript as a work of Ulpian, but Savigny immediately suggested that it was, in fact, the famous work of Gaius. Savigny publicised the discovery of the manuscript and his conjecture, that the Institutes had been found, in the 1817 volume of his  .

The reason for Niebuhr's visit to Verona is still a somewhat contentious academic issue: Some scholars argue that Niebuhr was on a confidential mission to obtain the already discovered manuscript, while many others see a fortunate coincidence ("").

Egyptian fragments 
A further fragment was located in 1933 and sold in Cairo (PSI XI, 1182) The seller claimed that the fragment stemmed from Antinoöpolis. A comparison of the fragment with the  again established the firm consistency of the Institutes.

Indirect transmission 
The work of Gaius has also been indirectly handed down to modern times, as it was frequently used as a model for various legal writings during the 5th and 6th centuries. The so-called  provides relatively little insight into the text. Later known as components of the Corpus Juris Civilis, the influences of Gaius also found their way into the Digestes and the Institutiones Iustiniani.

Significance and authorship

Significance 
The Institutes were produced around 161 CE under Roman emperor Antoninus Pius, and are considered to be "by far the most influential elementary-systematic presentation of Roman private law in late antiquity, the Middle Ages and modern times". The Institutes were a didactic work. Some consider Gaius and his Institutes to be the "true architect of Justinian's collection" and to Justinian himself he was "" ("our Gaius").

The Institutes are also distinguished by the fact that they are the only almost completely preserved work of classical Roman jurisprudence.

They continue to offer the advantages of a coherent academic lecture that impresses with its clarity, its comprehensibility and, especially, its simplicity. In addition, Gaius' legal thinking is said to be "much closer to the dogmatic tradition of continental [European] jurisprudence (i.e. the striving for systems, the effort to form concepts and to classify, and the tendency towards abstraction) than the method of any other ancient jurist".

Authorship 
The extent to which the Institutes have been written by Gaius alone, and what part of them, if any, are, e.g. glosses or interpolations, is still only subject to scholarly speculation. However, scholars agree on the enormous significance of the (re-)discovery of the Institutes since "numerous legal institutions that the Justinianic commission left unmentioned as obsolete are known only through the new find".

Structure and influence

Structure of the Institutes 
The Institutes are divided into a scheme of personal rights and family law, law concerning things and procedural law. In personal and family law, a distinction is made between freemen and slaves. Property law is divided into corporeal things and incorporeal things as well as inheritance law, income law and the law of obligations. Furthermore, obligations are divided into contractual and tortious obligations.

Influence on later civil codes 
This classification, probably borrowed from the Hellenistic textbook pattern, replaced and levelled previous structures and became a basic model followed by many modern civil law systems. For example, the Austrian  (ABGB) is still structured according to the institutional system, in contrast to the German  (BGB), which follows the pandectistic system. Furthermore, the structure of the Institutes –  ,  and  – were a model for the Castilian , the French  and even the Corpus Juris Canonici.

Citing the Institutes 
In academic literature the Institutes are sometimes cited as "Gai. 1,1" (referring to book 1, section 1 of the Institutes), while other authors prefer "Gai. inst. 4,44" (referring to book 4, section 44 of the Institutes). The Bluebook recommends the following citation style: "G. Inst. 1.144" (referring to book 1, section 144 of the Institutes).

Editions 
The author of the 1911 Encyclopædia Britannica recommends the 1885 edition by Edward Poste, which includes an English translation.

  [Editio princeps]
 
  [Contains an English translation]
 
  [Contains an English translation]
 
  [Contains an English translation]
  [Contains a German translation]

References

Footnotes

Sources

Further reading

External links 
 .
 

Roman law
2nd century in law
2nd-century texts